James Reardon was a British stage and film actor of the silent era. He also directed several films including The Glad Eye (1920).

Selected filmography

Director
 To Let (1919) a British silent ghost movie
 The Glad Eye (1920)
 The Shadow of Evil (1921)

Actor
 A Rogue in Love (1916)
 A Romany Lass (1918)
 Rogues of the Turf (1923)
 Little Miss Nobody (1923)
 The School for Scandal (1923)
 The Feather (1929)
 Naughty Husbands (1930)

References

Bibliography
 Low, Rachael. History of the British Film, 1914-1918. Routledge, 2005.

External links

British male film actors
British film directors
1885 births
Year of death unknown